Akron Falls Park is a  park in the Village of Akron and Town of Newstead, New York. A major feature of the park is a scenic  waterfall on Murder Creek, a small stream that flows through the park. The park is operated by the Erie County Department of Parks, Recreation and Forestry, and is free and open year-round.

History
The park's core was originally managed by the Village of Akron in the early 1930s. In 1933, approximately 90 workers from the Civil Works Administration labored to improve the park. The park was transferred to Erie County in 1947, making it one of the county's oldest parks. In the years that followed, the county purchased adjacent property, which would eventually house the park's picnic shelters and ice skating facilities.

Park facilities
The park has facilities for soccer, baseball, softball and tennis. Several shelters are located within the park and may be reserved for events and gatherings. Trails for hiking and bicycling are found throughout the property. During the winter, the park features ice skating facilities, a sledding hill and cross-country skiing trails.

References

External links
 Map of Akron Falls Park
 Akron Falls description at NYFalls.com

Parks in Erie County, New York
Landforms of Erie County, New York
Waterfalls of New York (state)